Karayevia amoena is a species of diatom belonging to the family Achnanthidiaceae.

This species inhabits freshwater environments.

Synonym:
 Kolbesia amoena (Hustedt) J.C.Kingston, 2000

References

Achnanthales